Eucalyptus famelica is a species of mallee that is endemic to Western Australia. It has smooth grey and pale brown bark, sometimes with thin, rough, fibrous bark near the base of the trunk on larger plants. The adult leaves are lance-shaped, the flower buds are arranged in groups of seven, the flowers are creamy white and the fruit is cup-shaped to cylindrical.

Description
It has smooth, grey and pale pinkish brown bark, sometimes with thin, rough fibrous bark on the lower trunk of larger specimens. Flowering occurs between April and July and the flowers are creamy white.

Taxonomy and naming
Eucalyptus famelica was first formally described in 1989 by Ian Brooker and Stephen Hopper from a specimen Brooker collected near Starvation Boat Harbour, and the description was published in the journal Nuytsia.<ref name=APNI>{{cite web|title=Eucalyptus famelica|url= https://id.biodiversity.org.au/instance/apni/455235|publisher=APNI|access-date=5 July 2019}}</ref> The specific epithet (famelica) is derived from a Latin word meaning "hungry", an oblique reference to the type location.

Distribution and habitat
This mallee mainly grows in winter-wet sites in undulating sandplain and is only known from a few locations between Ravensthorpe and Esperance.

Conservation statusEucalyptus famelica'' is classified as "Priority Three" by the Government of Western Australia Department of Parks and Wildlife meaning that it is poorly known and known from only a few locations but is not under imminent threat.

See also
List of Eucalyptus species

References

Eucalypts of Western Australia
famelica
Myrtales of Australia
Plants described in 1989
Taxa named by Ian Brooker
Taxa named by Stephen Hopper